Sandra Keen (born 13 August 1947) is a British former swimmer. She competed in two events at the 1964 Summer Olympics.

She also represented England and won a bronze medal in 440 yards freestyle relay, at the 1962 British Empire and Commonwealth Games in Perth, Western Australia. She also participated in the 110 yards freestyle event.

She swam for the Heston Swimming Club.

References

1947 births
Living people
British female swimmers
Olympic swimmers of Great Britain
Swimmers at the 1964 Summer Olympics
Place of birth missing (living people)
Commonwealth Games medallists in swimming
Commonwealth Games bronze medallists for England
Swimmers at the 1962 British Empire and Commonwealth Games
20th-century British women
Medallists at the 1962 British Empire and Commonwealth Games